Players and pairs who neither have high enough rankings nor receive wild cards may participate in a qualifying tournament held one week before the annual Wimbledon Tennis Championships.

Seeds

  Melinda Czink (qualified)
  Eva Birnerová (first round)
  Garbiñe Muguruza (second round)
  Misaki Doi (qualifying competition, lucky loser)
  Sesil Karatantcheva (qualifying competition)
  Mariana Duque Mariño (first round)
  Paula Ormaechea (first round)
  Stefanie Vögele (second round)
  Karolína Plíšková (qualified)
  Olivia Rogowska (second round)
  Lara Arruabarrena (qualifying competition)
  Mirjana Lučić (qualified)
  Claire Feuerstein (qualifying competition)
  CoCo Vandeweghe (qualified)
  Valeria Savinykh (qualifying competition)
  Erika Sema (second round)
  Aravane Rezaï (second round)
  Alla Kudryavtseva (first round)
  Julia Cohen (first round)
  Yvonne Meusburger (second round)
  Dinah Pfizenmaier (second round)
  Kurumi Nara (first round)
  Mihaela Buzărnescu (second round)
  Bibiane Schoofs (qualifying competition)

Qualifiers

  Melinda Czink
  Annika Beck
  Maria Elena Camerin
  Kristina Mladenovic
  Sandra Zaniewska
  Vesna Dolonc
  Jana Čepelová
  Kristýna Plíšková
  Karolína Plíšková
  Camila Giorgi
  CoCo Vandeweghe
  Mirjana Lučić

Lucky loser
  Misaki Doi

Qualifying draw

First qualifier

Second qualifier

Third qualifier

Fourth qualifier

Fifth qualifier

Sixth qualifier

Seventh qualifier

Eighth qualifier

Ninth qualifier

Tenth qualifier

Eleventh qualifier

Twelfth qualifier

External links

2012 Wimbledon Championships on WTAtennis.com
2012 Wimbledon Championships – Women's draws and results at the International Tennis Federation

Women's Singles Qualifying
Wimbledon Championship by year – Women's singles qualifying
Wimbledon Championships